The Shāh Abdol-Azīm Shrine, also known as Shabdolazim, located in Rey, Iran, contains the tomb of ‘Abdul ‘Adhīm ibn ‘Abdillāh al-Hasanī (aka Shah Abdol Azim). Shah Abdol Azim was a fifth generation descendant of Hasan ibn ‘Alī and a companion of Muhammad al-Taqī. He was entombed here after his death in the 9th century.

Adjacent to the shrine, within the complex, include the mausolea of Imamzadeh Tahir (son of the fourth Shia Imam Sajjad) and Imamzadeh Hamzeh (brother of the eighth Twelver Imām - Imām Reza).

Background
Abdol Azim migrated to Rayy out of persecution and subsequently died there. A piece of paper was found in his pocket outlining his ancestry as being: ‘Abdul ‘Adhīm son of ‘Abdillāh son of ‘Alī son of Husayn son of Zayd son of Hasan ibn ‘Alī. Shah Abdol Azim was sent to Rayy ( Modern day Tehran) by Imam Reza. His journey was full of hardships but he successfully reached there and delivered the message of Imam. He was one of the pious persons of his time. During his journey many spies of Abbasid Caliph Al-Matawakkil tried to capture him but failed. A movie on the life of Shah Abdol Azim Al-Hasani has been made and is available in Persian and Urdu languages.

History and design

Ibn Qūlawayh al-Qummī (d. 978 CE) "includes the shrine in his Kāmil al-Ziyārāt, one of the earliest pilgrimage guides for the Shiʿa, which suggests that the tomb of ʿAbd al-Aẓīm was already of some importance by the tenth century." The tomb of Abdol-Azim had also come under the patronage of Sunni rulers at times, a notable example being the mausoleum constructed over Abdol-Azim's tomb in the 1090s CE by orders of the Seljuk vizier Majd  al-Mulk  Asʿad  b.  Muḥammad b. Mūsā.

The whole construction consists of a portal with a lofty Iwan decorated with mirrors, several courtyards, a golden cupola, two tile minarets, a portico, a sepulcher, and a mosque.

The most historical and portable relic of this holy place, is its costly box which is made of betel-nut wood. On four sides of this precious box, a relief inscription in Nastaliq and Thuluth characters, is carved. The inscription ends with the date  1330 CE, and the name of the maker of the box, i.e., Yahya ibn Muhammad al-Isfahani.

An inlaid door near the mausoleum of Nasser al-Din Shah, (This place used to be called Masjid-i-Holaku, prior to its being turned into a tomb) which bears the date 1450 CE, i.e., the period of Shah-rokh Bahadur Timurid`s reign, constitutes another historical relic of this structure.

Two antique iron doors which are engraved with Kufic inscriptions are to be found in the treasure-house of the (Astaneh), which seem to be the oldest remains of this structure and to belong to the Seljukid period. But, at present, these two doors and the concluding part of their inscriptions bear the date 1538. Further, there is an inlaid door which had formerly been installed in the northern part of the ivan of Imamzadeh Hamzeh.

This door has an inscription in Tulth calligraphy, dated 1512. The cupola of this structure has been built upon the order of Majd al-Mulk radestani Qomi, and later on has been plated with gold. The ivan, portico and portal of the building date from the reign of Shah Tahmasp I (Safavid king). The gold-threaded silk belonging to the Safavid period. The silver-plated sepulcher has been made and installed by the order of Fath Ali Shah Qajar. The mirror-work, paintings and gildings of the structure belong to the 19th century. Reparations are still being carried out in this complex of holy structures. Adjoining this holy tomb, there are some other tombs belonging to the Qajar monarchs, and the Ulamahs (religious scholars) and other personalities.

Notable Burials 
Abdol-Azim al-Hassani (789–866) – medieval scholar
Morteza Razi (fa) (11th cent.) – medieval scholar
Abu al-Futuh al-Razi (1087–1157) – medieval scholar
Ahmad Monshi Qomi (1547–1607) – scholar
Abolghasem Ghaem-Magham Farahani (1779–1835) – prime minister (1834–35)
Mohammad-Sharif Khan Mafi (fa) (d. 1847) – politician
Qaani Shirazi (1808–1854) – poet
Saadat-Ali Shah (fa) (d. 1876) – leader of Nematullahi Gonabadi Sufi order
Abbas-Ali Dadashbeig (fa) (1814–1878) – military officer and father of Reza Shah
Mohammad Khan Majd ol-Molk Sinaki (fa) (1809–1881) – politician
Bahram Mirza Moezz od-Dowleh (1806–1882) – Qajar prince and politician
Ali Kani (1805–1888) – cleric
Nasser al-Din Shah Qajar (1831–1896) – Shahanshah of Persia (1848–96)
Mohammad-Ali Sadr ol-Mamalek (fa) (d. 1902) – politician
Vajihollah Mirza (az) (1854–1905) – Qajar prince and politician
Sattar Khan (1866–1914) – a leader of Persian Constitutional Revolution
Soltan Hossein Mirza Jalal od-Dowleh (fa) (1868–1914) – Qajar prince and politician
Nour-Ali Shah II (fa) (1867–1918) – leader of Nematullahi Gonabadi Sufi order
Abolhassan Mirza (az) (1847–1919) – Qajar prince and politician
Mohammad Tabatabai (1842–1920) – cleric a leader of Persian Constitutional Revolution
Malek-Mansour Mirza Sho'a' os-Saltaneh (1880–1920) – Qajar prince
Mohammad Khiabani (1880–1920) – politician
Abolqassem Naser ol-Molk (1866–1927) – politician and regent of Persia (1911–14)
Ahmad Bader Nasir od-Dowleh (fa) (1870–1930) – politician
Raf'at Semnani (fa) (1882–1931) – poet
Mohammad-Hossein Nadoushani (fa) (1864–1932) – politician
Ali-Mardan Khan (fa) (1892–1934) – chief of Bakhtiari tribe
Banoo Ozma Eftekhar od-Dowleh (fa) (1857–1935) – Qajar princess
Nezameddin Hekmat Moshar od-Dowleh (fa) (1883–1936) – politician
Abdollah Haeri Rahmat-Ali Shah (fa) (1862–1937) – Sufi leader
Mohammad Aghazadeh Khorasani (1877–1937) – cleric
Firouz Mirza Nostrat od-Dowleh (1889–1938) – Qajar prince and politician
Abdol-Hossein Mirza Farmanfarma (1852–1939) – Qajar prince and politician
Reza Shah Pahlavi (1878–1944) – chief of Persian Cossack Brigade (1920–21), prime minister (1923–24) and Shahanshah of Iran (1925–41) (Reza Shah's mausoleum)
Gholamhossein Rahnama (fa) (1882–1946) – scholar
Sadr-ol-Eslam Khoei (fa) (1887–1948) – scholar
Mohammad Qazvini (1877–1949) – scholar
Esmail Merat (1893–1949) – politician
Abdollah Mostowfi (fa) (1878–1950) – politician
Mostafa Adl (1882–1950) – politician
Haj-Ali Razmara (1901–1951) – prime minister (1950–51)
Moahammad Mazaher (fa) (1875–1954) – politician
Ali-Reza Pahlavi (1922–1954) – Pahlavi prince and son of Reza Shah
Abbas Eqbal Ashtiani (1896–1956) – scholar
Ali Soheili (1896–1958) – prime minister (1942, 1943–44)
Mohammad-Sadegh Tabatabaei (1881–1961) – politician
Abolghasem Kashani (1882–1962) – cleric and politician
Fazlollah Zahedi (1892–1963) – army general and prime minister (1953–55)
Tayyeb Haj-Rezaei (fa) (1911–1963) – political activist
Abdol-Azim Gharib (ru) (1879–1965) – scholar
Nezam-Vafa Arani (fa) (1887–1965) – poet
Hassan-Ali Mansur (1923–1965) – prime minister (1964–65)
Ziaeddin Tabatabaei (1889–1969) – journalist and prime minister (1921)
Badiozzaman Forouzanfar (1897–1970) – scholar
Ahmad Matin-Daftari (1897–1971) – prime minister (1939–40)
Mohammad-Ali Emam-Shoushtari (1902–1972) – scholar
Davoud Maghami (fa) (1938–1972) – politician
Mohammad-Kazem Assar (fa) (1884–1975) – scholar
Ahmad Ashtiani (1882–1975) – cleric
Hajj Khazen Ol-Molk (1831-1901) – merchant, scholar
Mohammad-Amir Khatami (1920–1975) – commander in chief of IIAF (1958–75)
Ali-Asghar Hekmat (1892–1980) – politician
Soleiman Behboudi (fa) (1896–1981) – politician
Nasrollah Falsafi (fa) (1901–1981) – scholar
Reza Mafi (fa) (1943–1982) – calligrapher
Hassan Nayyerzadeh (fa) (1928–1983) – scholar
Karim Amiri Firuzkouhi (1910–1984) – painter
Mohammad-Ali Hedayati (fa) (1910–1986) – politician
Amanollah Ardalan Ezz-ol-Mamalek (fa) (1884–1987) – politician
Mehdi Soheili (fa) (1924–1987) – poet
Hossein Lankarani (fa) (1889–1989) – politician
Shamseddin Jazayeri (fa) (1913–1990) – politician
Mohammad Taghi-Falsafi (1908–1998) – cleric
Abdol-Karim Haghshenas (1919–2007) – cleric
Abolghasem Gorji (fa) (1923–2010) – scholar
Mohammad-Ali Taraghijah (1943–2010) – painter
Mostafa Ahmadi Roshan (1979–2012) – scholar
Azizollah Khoshvaght (1926–2013) – cleric
Mojtaba Tehrani (1937–2013) – cleric
Sadegh Tirafkan (1965–2013) – artist
Vali Akbar (fa) (1970–2013) – wrestler
Mohammad-Reza Mahdavi Kani (1931–2014) – cleric and prime minister (1981)
Parviz Moayyed-Ahd (fa) (1929–2016) – scholar
Mohammad-Taghi Nourbakhsh (fa) (1962–2018) – scholar
Mohammad-Ali Shahidi (1949–2020) – cleric and politician
Ali Akbar Mohtashamipur (1947–2021) – cleric and politician
Seyyed Mohammad Ziaabadi (1928-2021) - cleric

See also

 Holiest sites in Islam (Shia)
 Imām Ridhā Mosque
 Fatimah al-Ma'sūmah Mosque

References

Further reading
 
 Kondo, Nobuaki The Shah ʿAbd al-ʿAzim Shrine and its Vaqf under the Safavids.

Mausoleums in Iran
Shia shrines
Mosques in Iran
Mosque buildings with domes
Buildings and structures in Tehran Province
Safavid architecture
Tourist attractions in Tehran Province